Alésia Toyoko Glidewell (born December 8, 1978) is an American web-series-director, producer, and voice-actress. She was previously the owner of a small production-company.

Career
She has provided voices for video games, including Sly 2: Band of Thieves, where she plays Carmelita Fox and Constable Neyla; Star Fox: Assault and  Super Smash Bros. Brawl, where she plays the role of Krystal, as well as playing Zero Suit Samus and Knuckle Joe. Alésia provided the voice and movements of the adult Alma Wade in F.E.A.R. 2: Project Origin and F.E.A.R. 3. In the credits of F.E.A.R. 2: Project Origin, she goes by the name Alicia Glidwell.

In both games of the Portal series, she provided the face and body model for the games' protagonist, Chell.

Personal life
Glidewell was born in Honolulu, Hawaii to a Brazilian-American father and Japanese mother. She speaks fluent English, Spanish, Italian, and Portuguese and is a world traveler and animal lover. Alésia's nickname in high school was Toy, a shortening of her middle name, Toyoko.

Roles

References

External links
 Official Site
 
 Krystal Archive's Interview

Living people
Actresses from Honolulu
American voice actresses
American video game actresses
21st-century American actresses
American people of Japanese descent
1978 births

American people of Brazilian descent
Emory University alumni
Brazilian actors
Brazilian television producers
Brazilian women television producers